Diplacus nanus is a species of monkeyflower known by the common name dwarf purple monkeyflower. It is native to California and the Northwestern United States to Montana. It grows in moist habitat, often in bare or disturbed soils. It was formerly known as Mimulus nanus.

Description
Diplacus nanus is a hairy annual herb growing at ground level or erect to 10 centimeters tall. The oppositely arranged purple-green leaves are oval or oblong and up to 2.5 centimeters long.

The tubular, wide-faced flower is usually magenta or purple with two yellow stripes in the mouth, but is occasionally all yellow. The flower is up to 2 cm long.

See also
Erythranthe mephiticus

References

External links
Jepson Manual Treatment — Mimulus nanus
USDA Plants Profile: Mimulus nanus (dwarf purple monkey flower)
Mimulus nanus Photo gallery

nanus
Flora of California
Flora of the Northwestern United States
Flora of Nevada
Flora of Oregon
Flora of the Cascade Range
Flora of the Great Basin
Flora of the Klamath Mountains
Flora without expected TNC conservation status